Enid High School (EHS) is a public tertiary school in Enid, Oklahoma, U.S., operated by the Enid Public Schools school district. With a student body of about 2035 in grades 9-12, Enid High School has a matriculation rate of about 65 percent. Some graduates continue their education at University of Oklahoma, Oklahoma State University, or other establishments in Oklahoma. In recent years some have gone to West Point, Princeton University, Trinity University (Texas) and Yale University.

The school district - Enid High's attendance zone - covers central-west Enid and some unincorporated areas.

History

EHS began as a tent school shortly after the land run in 1893, operating out of various locations throughout Enid including an opera house and a Baptist church. Between 1906 and 1912, classes took place in the "old" Lincoln school, now long-demolished, at 600 North Independence. By February 1912, the high school's current building was constructed. It was accredited by the North Central Association of Colleges and Secondary Schools in 1911, and holds the distinction of being the second high school in Oklahoma to be accredited by the organization. Enid High operated as a segregated school district from 1896 to 1959 with black children attending Booker T. Washington, Douglass and George Washington Carver Schools.

In 1943, a fire broke out, damaging the building. From 1943 to 1948, classes were held at Emerson and Longfellow Junior High Schools, displacing the seventh graders, who remained at their respective elementary schools. The school finished restoration in 1948, added a gym in 1950, an auditorium in 1953, a music building in 1991, and a large food court in 2005 to accommodate a new closed campus policy. During these times several new class rooms were also added. The building did not have air conditioning until a bond was passed in 1997.

Demographics
In 2017, 200 of the students were Marshallese. By 2014 the school had a student club where Marshallese students taught the overall student population about their culture. Circa 2014 a multicultural choir was formed.

Athletics and clubs

Enid High School has several sports programs including American football, baseball, basketball, bowling, cheerleading, cross country, golf, marching band, track and field, tennis, soccer, softball, swimming, volleyball, show choir, and wrestling.

The basketball, wrestling, and volleyball programs were played in the historic Mark Price Arena until March 23, 2008, when the athletic director, Bill Mayberry, made the decision to move the home games and events to the athletic village on the Northern Oklahoma College campus, due to the deteriorating condition of the arena. The Plainsmen American football and soccer programs play in one of the oldest stadiums in the state, D. Bruce Selby Stadium.

Awards
The Plainsmen American football team has won six state championships (in 1919, 1942, 1964, 1965, 1966 and 1983) and was runner-up in 2006.
Enid High School is known for its "Big Blue Band", which has placed in the finals for the Oklahoma Bandmaster's Competition every year from 1981 to 2009 and has consistently won superior ratings since 2014.
Enid High School's Political Science/Constitution Team has won state competitions and made it to national competitions in 18 out of 19 years.

Notable alumni 

Bess Truitt 1901 - Oklahoma Poet Laureate
Marquis James 1909 – Pulitzer Prize–winning author
Vida Chenoweth 1947 – classical marimba player, linguist
Owen K. Garriott 1948 – astronaut
Don Haskins 1948 – Naismith Basketball Hall of Fame. Oklahoma State player. Coach of 1966 NCAA Champion Texas Western (later UTEP), which was basis of best-selling book and movie "Glory Road." Assistant coach for U.S. Basketball in 1968, 1972 Olympics.
Leona Mitchell 1949 - world-renowned opera singer
Jim Sheets 1949 – Arkansas politician; Kiwanis International figure
J. Quinn Brisben 1952 - 1992 Socialist party presidential candidate, poet 
Jimmy O'Neill - 1957 - Host of Shindig!
Harry Jones 1963 – played American football for Philadelphia Eagles (1967–1971)
Harold Hamm 1964 – billionaire oil and gas developer 
Jim Riley 1965 – American football player, defensive end for the Oklahoma Sooners and Miami Dolphins (1967–1972)
Ken Mendenhall 1966 – played American football for Baltimore Colts (1971–1981)
Michael Hedges 1972 – Grammy-winning musician
Serene Jones 1977 - President and Johnston Family Professor for Religion and Democracy at Union Theological Seminary in the City of New York
Ray Hayward, 1979 – baseball player, selected by San Diego Padres in first round (10th overall) of the 1983 amateur entry draft
Quraysh Ali Lansana 1982 - American poet, civil rights historian
Mark Price 1982 – retired NBA and Georgia Tech point guard
Brent Price 1987 –  retired NBA basketball player, South Carolina and Oklahoma point guard 
Louisa McCune - 1988, Oklahoma Today editor
Todd Lamb 1990 – Lieutenant Governor of Oklahoma
Thad Luckinbill 1994 – actor
Stacy Prammanasudh 1998 – professional golfer, LPGA 
D.L. Lang 2001 - Poet laureate of Vallejo, California 
Mark Potts 2003 - Pulitzer Prize winning Journalist
Daniel Holtzclaw 2005 – Oklahoma City police officer, convicted in 2015 of multiple counts of rape and sexual assault
John Holt – played American football for Tampa Bay Buccaneers (1981–1985) and Indianapolis Colts (1985–1989)
Jerry Keeling – played Canadian football for the Calgary Stampeders (1961–1974), Ottawa Rough Riders (1975), Hamilton Tiger-Cats (1976)
Homer Paine – played American football for Chicago Hornets (1949)
Stan West – American football player; 1950–1954 Los Angeles Rams, 1955 New York Giants, 1956–1957 Chicago Cardinals

Gallery

See also
Enid Public Schools

References

Public high schools in Oklahoma
Schools in Enid, Oklahoma